Claire Nebout (born 20 May 1964) is a French actress. She has appeared in 55 films and television shows since 1986. She co-starred in In the Country of Juliets, which was entered into the 1992 Cannes Film Festival.

Filmography

References

External links

1964 births
Living people
French film actresses
People from Bourg-la-Reine
French television actresses
20th-century French actresses
21st-century French actresses